Yin Yin (born 2 January 1974 in Zhejiang) is the retired China women's national volleyball team Outside Hitter.

Clubs
  Zhejiang (1996-2001)
  Edison Modena (2001–2002)
  Zhejiang (2002-2003)
  Icot Tec Europa Systems Forlì (2003-2004)
  Zhejiang (2004-2005)
  Guangdong Evergrande (2009–2010)

Awards

Clubs
 1996-1997 Chinese League A —  Bronze Medal, with Zhejiang
 1997-1998 Chinese League A —  Bronze Medal, with Zhejiang
 1998-1999 Chinese League A —  Runner-Up, with
 2001-2002 CEV Cup —   Champion, with Edison Volley Modena
 Italian Cup —   Champion, with Edison Volley Modena
 2004-2005 Chinese League A —  Bronze Medal, with Zhejiang
 2009-2010 Chinese League B —  Champion, with Guangdong Evergrande

External links
 sportswomen Profile

1974 births
Living people
Chinese women's volleyball players
Olympic volleyball players of China
Volleyball players at the 2000 Summer Olympics
Volleyball players from Zhejiang
Asian Games medalists in volleyball
Volleyball players at the 1998 Asian Games
Asian Games gold medalists for China
Medalists at the 1998 Asian Games
Outside hitters
Chinese expatriate sportspeople
Chinese expatriates in Italy
Expatriate volleyball players in Italy
20th-century Chinese women